Tanya Rodríguez (born 7 June 2000) is a Dominican Republic karateka. She won the gold medal in the women's kumite -68 kg event at the 2019 Pan American Games held in Lima, Peru.

She won one of the bronze medals in the women's team kumite event at the 2022 Bolivarian Games held in Valledupar, Colombia.

Achievements

References 

Living people
2000 births
Place of birth missing (living people)
Dominican Republic female karateka
Pan American Games medalists in karate
Pan American Games gold medalists for the Dominican Republic
Karateka at the 2019 Pan American Games
Medalists at the 2019 Pan American Games
21st-century Dominican Republic women